Isaiah Warner Farmstead is a historic home and farm located in Wrightstown Township, Bucks County, Pennsylvania. The original section of the house was built in 1793, with additions dated to about 1830 and 1935. It is a 2 1/2-story, stone farmhouse with a slate covered gable roof constructed in three sections. It measures 64 feet long and approximately 20 feet deep and is in the Federal style. Also on the property are two two-story, 19th century frame barns and a shed, corn crib, and chicken house dated to the early 20th century.

It was added to the National Register of Historic Places in 2004.

References

Farms on the National Register of Historic Places in Pennsylvania
Federal architecture in Pennsylvania
Houses completed in 1793
Houses in Bucks County, Pennsylvania
National Register of Historic Places in Bucks County, Pennsylvania